Riding with Sugar is a South African drama film directed, written and produced by Sunu Gonera. The film stars Charles Mnene, Hakeem Kae-Kazim, Simona Brown, Hlayani Junior Mabasa, Paballo Koza and Neo Munhenga.

Cast
 Charles Mnene as Joshua
 Hakeem Kae-Kazim as Mambo
 Simona Brown as Olivia
 Hlayani Junior Mabasa as Rusty
 Paballo Koza as Vetkoek
 Neo Munhenga as Femi
 Shelley Nicole as Lead dancer
 Brendon Daniels as Green Eyes

Production
In November 2018, it was revealed that the film began production. The film was shot in Cape Town, South Africa.

Release
Riding with Sugar was released on 27 November 2020 on Netflix.

References

External links
 

2020 films
2020 drama films
2020s English-language films
English-language South African films
South African drama films